Marco Claúdio Cardoso Lourenço (born 5 May 1979), known as Marco Cláudio, is a Portuguese former footballer who played as a central midfielder.

Club career
Born in Lisbon, Marco Cláudio appeared in 52 Primeira Liga matches over three seasons, scoring four goals for S.C. Salgueiros. He spent most of his 16-year senior career in the Segunda Liga, netting 20 times from 185 appearances for a host of clubs.

Marco Cláudio retired in 2013 at the age of 36, after two years in amateur football with SC Rio Tinto.

International career
Marco Cláudio was part of the Portugal squad at the 1999 FIFA World Youth Championship held in Nigeria. He scored in the 1–1 draw against Japan in the round of 16, in a penalty shootout loss where he converted his attempt.

References

External links

1979 births
Living people
Footballers from Lisbon
Portuguese footballers
Association football midfielders
União Montemor players
Primeira Liga players
Liga Portugal 2 players
Segunda Divisão players
S.C. Salgueiros players
G.D. Chaves players
S.C. Espinho players
C.D. Feirense players
Varzim S.C. players
S.C. Freamunde players
C.D. Aves players
Portugal youth international footballers